Charles Chaplin (30 May 1759 – 28 August 1816) was an English member of parliament (MP). A graduate of St John's College, Cambridge, Chaplin was the brother-in-law of Lord George Manners-Sutton, who married Chaplin's only sister Diana.

He was appointed high sheriff of Lincolnshire in 1785. He was one of the two MPs for Lincolnshire from 1802 until his death in 1816, aged 57.

References

1759 births
1816 deaths
Alumni of St John's College, Cambridge
Members of the Parliament of the United Kingdom for English constituencies
UK MPs 1802–1806
UK MPs 1806–1807
UK MPs 1807–1812
UK MPs 1812–1818
High Sheriffs of Lincolnshire